The 2006 St. Catharines municipal election took place on 13 November 2006 to determine a mayor, regional and city councillors and school trustees in the city of St. Catharines, Ontario.  The incumbent mayor, Tim Rigby, vacated the mayoral position and ran for election to Niagara Regional Council.

Mayoral results

Niagara Regional Council

Judy Casselman has a Diploma in Public Health Nursing, and has worked as a registered nurse.  She represented Ward Two (St. Andrews) on city council from 1992 to 2003, and was deputy mayor in the 1990s.  She was elected to the regional council in 2003 and re-elected in 2006, topping the polls both times.  Casselman is an advocate for preserving rural lands.  She was a founding member of Heritage St. Catharines, Friends of the Twelve and the St. Catharines Community Foundation, and is a board member of the Niagara Symphony.
Michael R. Collins is a graduate of Carleton University, and for many years taught Communication and Municipal Finance at Niagara College.  He served three terms as a St. Catharines city councillor, and has been a member of the Niagara Regional Council since 1985.  He opposed a provincial Sunday shopping extension in the 1980s, and was chair of a local group called People for Sunday.  He called for a freeze on welfare as a form of guaranteed income during the early 1990s, and supported a pioneer needle exchange program in 1992.  Collins has served on several local organizations and committees, including the Niagara Regional Housing Board and the Niagara Escarpment Commission, and is a board member of the Association of Municipalities of Ontario.
Brian Heit was a St. Catharines city councillor from 1988 to 2003.  He served on every major committee, and was deputy mayor for two terms.  He was first elected to the Niagara Regional Council in 2003, and has served on the Corporate and Financial Services Committee and the Human Resources Committee.
Ronna Katzman was elected as a School Board Trustee in 1991 and 1994, and as a St. Catharines City Councillor in 1997 and 2000.  She was first elected to the Niagara Regional Council in 2003, and has served on the Public Health and Social Services Committee.  In 2002, she recommended that St. Catharines phase out its purchase of electricity from polluting plants.  She has been a member of many boards and associations, including the St. Catharines Downtown Association.
N. Carlos Garcia is a businessman, with consulting experience in North America, Europe, East Asia and Africa.  He has Bachelor of Science, Master of Science and Master of Business Administration degrees, and is past chair of Port Realizing our Unique Distinction (PROUD), an historical preservation group in the Port Dalhousie area of St. Catharines.  PROUD opposed development plans proposed by the Port Dalhousie Vitalization Corp. (PDVC).
Bart Brouwer was born in the Netherlands in 1983, and moved to Canada in 1997. He is a member of the Covenant Christian Reformed Church, and assisted in the 2006 federal election.

St. Catharines City Council

Niagara Catholic District School Board

Trustee, Ward 1

Trustee, Ward 2,3,4,5,6

District School Board of Niagara

Footnotes

2006 Ontario municipal elections
2006